Personal Tailor is a 2013 Chinese comedy film directed by Feng Xiaogang and starring Ge You, Bai Baihe, Li Xiaolu and Zheng Kai.

Plot
The story centers on a company that grants wishes to people looking for a day away from their ordinary lives.

Cast 
List of cast by last name.
 Bai Baihe - Xiao Biao
 Nathaniel Boyd
 Bingkun Cai
 Jackie Chan - cameo. as himself.
 Scotty Bob Cox - Hans.
 Fan Wei (actor)
 Ge You as Zhong Yang
 Guan Xiaotong - Adult dream girl.
 Chengru Li
 Li Xiaolu as herself
 Yong Li
 Tian Kiang
 Pu Miao
 Angela Qiu - Empire Club Mama-san.
 Song Dandan
 Zheng Kai as Ma Qing
 Cao Bingkun as 'Commissioner' [Independent Commission Against Corruption]
 Zhang Jun Yi as Photographer

Release
The film "Personal Tailor" opened to a new record of US$13.2 million including midnight screenings beating Tiny Times record of $12 million set in July 2013. on December 20, 2019, it was released in United States.

References

External links
 
 Personal Tailor at rottentomatoes.com
 Personal Tailor at hollywoodreporter.com
 Personal Tailor at lovehkfilm.com

2013 films
Chinese comedy films
Films directed by Feng Xiaogang
Films with screenplays by Wang Shuo
Huayi Brothers films
2013 comedy films
2010s Mandarin-language films